Korbinian Strimmer (born 1972) is a German statistician specialising in biomedical data science. He is a professor in statistics at the University of Manchester.

Education 
Strimmer earned his PhD from the Ludwig Maximilian University of Munich in 1997 under the supervision of Arndt von Haeseler. His thesis is entitled Maximum Likelihood Methods in Molecular Phylogenetics.

Research and career 
Strimmer was a senior lecturer (W2 professor) at the University of Leipzig from 2007 until 2014. From 2014 until 2017, he was a reader at the Imperial College London, before becoming a professor in statistics at the University of Manchester in 2017.

He has co-authored biostatistical and bioinformatics software, including the phylogenetics package TREE-PUZZLE.

Awards and honours 
From 2014 to 2017 Thomson Reuters and Clarivate Analytics ranked Strimmer four times consecutively among "The World's Most Influential Scientific Minds" in the computer science category according to the number of citations.

References

External links 
 

Living people
1972 births
German statisticians
Ludwig Maximilian University of Munich alumni
Academics of the University of Manchester